Martindale is an extinct town in Franklin County, in the U.S. state of Washington. The GNIS classifies it as a populated place.

The community was named after M. P. Martin, a railroad official.

References

Ghost towns in Washington (state)
Geography of Franklin County, Washington